West Jacksonport is a small unincorporated community located in Door County, Wisconsin. The community is located at the intersection of County Highway V and County Highway T, in the center of the Door Peninsula, in the town of Jacksonport.

References 

Unincorporated communities in Wisconsin
Unincorporated communities in Door County, Wisconsin